Kansas's 8th congressional district for the United States House of Representatives was a congressional district in the state of Kansas.

It was created in 1903, and it existed  until 1933. William Augustus Ayres was the final person to represent the district before he was redistricted to the now-defunct 5th congressional district. Throughout its history it only had 3 representatives.

List of members representing the district

References

 Congressional Biographical Directory of the United States 1774–present

08
Former congressional districts of the United States